The ReFrame Stamp for Gender-Balanced Production certification is awarded by ReFrame to corporations and media that show progress toward gender equality and greater representation of women in key roles.

History 

On June 8, 2018, the ReFrame Stamp program was launched to promote and recognize gender-balanced productions in film and television based on data from IMDbPro on how many women are involved in a production in front of and behind the camera. On September 26, the Stamp program expanded to include submissions for TV shows and movies from cable and streaming platforms. ReFrame entered into a partnership in February 2020 with Delta Airlines in which two in-flight channels dedicated to films and television programs respectively with the ReFrame Stamp would be featured. The ReFrame Movie Channel launched with 29 initial offerings including Wonder Woman, The Hate U Give, Ocean's 8, and Lady Bird. The ReFrame Show Channel's initial releases included Supergirl, Empire, How to Get Away With Murder, and Better Things. These offerings were planned to cycle on a monthly basis with additions in each lineup.

Submission process 
Qualifying films must be distributed either theatrically or via streaming, while TV shows are counted in relation to the calendar for the Emmy Awards. Films and television which are not considered top 100 grossing projects may be considered through a rolling open call via a manual submission process.

During any given submission period, the individual entering the information regarding the feature film which has been distributed theatrically or via streaming must utilize the Narrative Feature, Animated Feature, or Television submission form. As of 2019, information provided in each submission must include the project title, year of release, studio (or platform), distributor, and contact information for both a production and studio/distributor representative. The submission must specify the positions of each woman involved in qualifying areas for consideration, as well as whether each of those specified is a person of color. Appeals for ReFrame Stamp submissions are reviewed using an independent panel and may be submitted via email.

Criteria 
Based on a points system, narrative films and animated films and TV programs must achieve four points within the eight defined qualifying categories with at least two points in the categories of female director, writer, and lead. Double points are awarded for women of color in important positions. Screen time analysis is done with the Geena Davis Inclusion Quotient (GD-IQ), while points are calculated by an algorithm and given to the films or TV programs that meet the requirements. After the stamp is awarded, a logo is added to the end credits. The criteria are subject to change accordingly with the evolving industry.

Film

Television

Winners and nominees

Film

2017 Narrative and Animated Feature Recipients 
Announced June 7 and August 28, 2018

2018 Feature Recipients
Announced March 6, 2019

2019 Top 100-Grossing Narrative Feature Recipients 
Announced February 26, 2020

2020 Top 100-Grossing Narrative Feature Recipients 
Announced February 17, 2021

Television

2017–2018 Television Recipients 
Announced November 13, 2018

2017–2018 Top 100 Most Popular Television Recipients 
Announced January 14, 2020

2018–2019 Top 100 Most Popular Television Recipients 
Announced January 14, 2020

2019–2020 Top 100 Most Popular Television Recipients 
Announced September 15, 2020

2020–21 Top 200 Most Popular Television Recipients 
Announced on July 20, 2021

See also
 Bechdel test

References

External links 
 Official website

American television awards
American film awards
Feminism and the arts
Women in film
Women in television